Pioneer Trails is a 1923 American silent Western film directed by David Smith and starring Cullen Landis, Alice Calhoun, and Bertram Grassby.

Plot
As described in a film magazine review, the lure of gold draws Robert Dale, his wife, and their son Jack over the prairie. The party is attacked by Indians and all save Jack are killed. He is adopted by another member of his party but, being only four years old, does not know his last name. Twenty years later he finds himself in love with a young woman, but, not knowing his origin, he dares not declare his love. She finally takes the initiative in her own hands, declares herlove, and is finally accepted, peculiar circumstances having by this time established Jack's birth and origin.

Cast

References

Bibliography

External links

1923 Western (genre) films
American silent feature films
Silent American Western (genre) films
American black-and-white films
Films directed by David Smith (director)
Vitagraph Studios films
1920s English-language films
1920s American films